Zatory  is a village in Pułtusk County, Masovian Voivodeship, in east-central Poland. It is the seat of the gmina (administrative district) called Gmina Zatory.

The village has a population of 970.

External links
 Jewish Community in Zatory on Virtual Shtetl

References

Villages in Pułtusk County